The Rattle River is a  river in the White Mountains of New Hampshire in the United States. It is a tributary of the Androscoggin River, which flows east into Maine, joining the Kennebec River close to the Atlantic Ocean.

The Rattle River rises in the saddle between Middle Moriah and Shelburne Moriah Mountain in the town of Shelburne, within the White Mountain National Forest.

The Appalachian Trail follows the river from its source to the Androscoggin River valley.

See also

List of rivers of New Hampshire

References

Rivers of New Hampshire
Rivers of Coös County, New Hampshire